The Bolshaya Lyampa is a river in Perm Krai, Russia, a right tributary of the Uls which in turn is a tributary of the Vishera. Its source is near the border with Sverdlovsk Oblast. It flows into the Uls  from the larger river's mouth. The Bolshaya Lyampa's main tributary is the Malaya Lyampa.

References 

Rivers of Perm Krai